Evangelos Basiakos (or Evangelos Bassiakos) (1954 in Thebes, Greece – 17 February 2017) was a Greek politician in the New Democracy party, Member of Parliament for Boetia and Minister for Rural Development and Food.

Qualification and positions
Lawyer, Political Scientist, LL.M., Beotia MP, Deputy Minister, Minister, Member of Parliamentary Assembly of International Organizations, Head of Environmental Sector ND.

Studies
Studies in Law and Political Sciences at the University of Athens.
Postgraduate Studies in International Law and Political Science in London (1979-1981), when he took his degrees DIPLOMA and MASTERS, University College London (UCL). He specialised in the Law of the EEC, in International and European Organizations, the Human Rights, Policy in Western Europe and in Political Sociology. Post Graduate courses at the Academy of International Law in The Hague, NATO and the EEC, the International Institute of Human Rights in Strasbourg, at the Seminar of the Harvard Alumni and at Faculty of the University of Pacific.

Party activities
Member of the New Democracy Party (ND) and ONNED since their foundation.
He has served as
– Member of Central Committee of Local Authorities (KETA) of ND (1987-1989).
– Assistant Secretary for International Relations of ND (1993-1994)
– Secretary of Rural Development ND (1994-1996)
– Chairman of Parliamentary Group Project (OKE) of ND for Agriculture (1997-2000).
– Head of Agricultural Policy ND (2000-2001)
– Head of Agricultural Sector ND (July 2001 – 2004).
– Head of Environmental Sector ND (2015- ).

Parliamentary career
He was elected MP of Beotia ND, elections in June and November 1989, 1990, 1996, 2000, 2004, 2007, May 2012, June 2012, January 2015 and September 2015 (first MP in the 1996 elections, 2000, 2004, 2007, May 2012, June 2012, January 2015 and September 2015).
Elected Secretary of the House in July and November 1989.
Full member of the Inter-Parliamentary Union (1989-1990), the Parliamentary Assembly of the Council of Europe (1990-1991), the International Organisation for Security and Cooperation in Europe (OSCE 1996 – 2004) and NATO (2007 – 2009 and 2012-now). He participated in many NATO summits in several countries including: USA, Russia, France, Germany, Italy, Belgium, Norway, Azerbaijan, Kazakhstan. From 2012 he participated  in NATO summits in Iceland, Czech Republic, Belgium, France, Luxemburg, Germany, Croatia, Lithuania, United Kingdom, Italy and Holland. From 2015 in Hungary, Ukraine, Norway, Belgium, Albania, Ukraine, Turkey and the United States of America.

Government action
Deputy Minister of Agriculture from 3.12.1992 to 13.10.1993.
Responsible for Forests and Natural Environment (Dec. 1992-May 1993), and responsible for the management of agricultural products, subsidies EEC, the Livestock and Agricultural “Research and Applications” (June – October ’93).
Deputy Minister for Agricultural Development and Food initially (09/03/2004) and
Minister for Agricultural Development and Food and Food from 23.9.2004 to 19.9.2007.

Later years
MP of Beotia ND.
Head of Environmental Sector ND.
Vice-President, Special Parliamentary Committee on Road Safety.
Member of Parliamentary Assembly / Nato.
Member of Parliamentary Committee on Product and Trade.

Personal life
He was married to Vicentia Syropoulou and father of a son called Athanasios-Aristeidis.

References

External links
 
 

1954 births
2017 deaths
Greek MPs 2012–2014
New Democracy (Greece) politicians
People from Thebes, Greece
National and Kapodistrian University of Athens alumni
Agriculture ministers of Greece
Government ministers of Greece
20th-century Greek lawyers
Greek MPs 1989 (June–November)
Greek MPs 1989–1990
Greek MPs 1990–1993
Greek MPs 1996–2000
Greek MPs 2000–2004
Greek MPs 2004–2007
Greek MPs 2007–2009
Greek MPs 2012 (May)
Greek MPs 2015 (February–August)
Greek MPs 2015–2019